Conus polongimarumai is a species of sea snail, a marine gastropod mollusk in the family Conidae, the cone snails and their allies.

Like all species within the genus Conus, these snails are predatory and venomous. They are capable of "stinging" humans, therefore live ones should be handled carefully or not at all.

Description
The size of the shell varies between 13 mm and 32 mm.

Distribution
This marine species occurs off the Philippines, the Marshall Islands; New Caledonia and Western Thailand.

References

 Kosuge S. (1980) Descriptions of two new species of the genus Conus (Gastropoda Conacea). Bulletin of the Institute of Malacology, Tokyo 1(4): 62–64, pl. 18.
 Puillandre N., Duda T.F., Meyer C., Olivera B.M. & Bouchet P. (2015). One, four or 100 genera? A new classification of the cone snails. Journal of Molluscan Studies. 81: 1–23

External links
 The Conus Biodiversity website
 Cone Shells – Knights of the Sea
 

polongimarumai
Gastropods described in 1980